Alistair Browning (8 February 1954 – 2 June 2019) was a New Zealand actor who won several awards for his work in film, television and theatre, best known for his roles in Merry Christmas, Mr. Lawrence, The Lord of the Rings, Rain, Futile Attraction, Siege, and Power Rangers Dino Super Charge.

Biography 
Browning regularly appeared in live professional theatre in New Zealand. He started his career at The Mercury Theatre in Auckland, New Zealand, in 1977 as an intern, immersing himself in all aspects of theatre, including stage management, lighting, sound and special effects operation, set construction, costuming as well as acting. In 1980 he joined the Court Theatre company, playing Hamlet among many other roles and continued to work there and throughout New Zealand in a wide variety of genres from modern comedy to Classical. In 1981, he joined the core cast of Australian soap opera The Sullivans, and afterwards worked often in Australia in theatre, film and television. He also performed in England at The Yvonne Arnaud, Old Vic and Shakespeare's Globe theatres.

He met award-winning musician David Bowie while filming for the movie Merry Christmas, Mr Lawrence; after Bowie's death in 2016, Browning told Stuff.co.nz about his experience.

He won Best Supporting Actor in a Feature Film at the 2001 Nokia New Zealand Film Awards for his role in Rain.

Browning died from cancer on 2 June 2019.

Partial filmography

References

External links

1954 births
2019 deaths
20th-century New Zealand male actors
21st-century New Zealand male actors
Deaths from cancer in New Zealand
New Zealand male film actors
New Zealand male soap opera actors
Actors from Dunedin